Osipovka is a rural locality (a village) in Skvorchikhinsky Selsoviet, Ishimbaysky District, Bashkortostan, Russia. The population was 21 as of 2010. There are 2 streets.

Geography 
Osipovka is located 25 km southeast of Ishimbay (the district's administrative centre) by road. Slobodka is the nearest rural locality.

References 

Rural localities in Ishimbaysky District